Nevzad Hanım ("young heroine"; born Nimet Bargu and previously Nevzad Kalfa and after 1928 Nimet Seferoğlu; 2 March 1902 – 23 June 1992) was the fifth and last consort of Sultan Mehmed VI of the Ottoman Empire. She was the last woman to marry an Ottoman sultan.

Early life
Nevzad Hanım was born on 2 March 1902 in Istanbul. Her origins was Albanian. Born as Nimet Bargu, she was the daughter of Şaban Efendi, a palace gardener, and her his wife Hatice Hanım. She had a sister, Nesrin Hanım, two years younger than her, and a brother, Salih Bey. Hüseyin Bey, who was the husband of her paternal aunt, presented Nimet and her sister Nesrin in the imperial harem, where according to the custom of the Ottoman court her name was changed to Nevzad. She was then sent to the harem of Şehzade Mehmed Ziyaeddin, where she served as Kalfa in the entourage of Safiye Ünüvar's student princesses and had taken the same classes and training as they. She was educated by a woman named Ceylanyar Hanım. After Mehmed's accession to the throne in 1918, she became one of the kalfas and went over to his palace.

First marriage

Nevzad married on 1 September 1921 in the Yıldız Palace. She was the last woman to marry an Ottoman sultan. She was given the title of "Second Ikbal", although, as fourth consort, she should have had that of Quarta Kadın. Mehmed was sixty-one while Nevzad was nineteen years old. The act of marrying her exacerbated the already frosty, and resentful relations between the children of later Sultan Mehmed V Reşad, and Mehmed VI's own family. Furthermore, Mehmed was so smitten by his new young consort as to be causing gossip in the capital due to his refusal to leave the harem and so part from her company.

Nevzad remained childless. She had a villa on the grounds of the Yıldız Palace. Her sister Nesrin, who had been renamed Sadiru, became senior lady-in-waiting to her. When Mehmed was deposed in 1922, she and other members of his family were imprisoned in the Feriye Palace, but managed to sneak out disguised as Kalfa. When the imperial family went to exile in March 1924, she stayed at Istanbul. On Mehmed's persisted requests, she and her sister Nesrin joined the deposed Sultan in San Remo, in May 1924. 

Nevzad was with Mehmed at the time of his death on 15 May 1926. Sultanzade Sami Bey, son of the sultan's sister Mediha Sultan confronted Nevzad, and attracted attention to the possibility of his uncle's having been murdered. Sami Bey, doubted that Nevzad was involved in his death. He interrogated her, and then sealed her personal property after the sultan's cupboards. Soon after Mehmed's death, Nevzad returned to Istanbul with her sister.

Second marriage
In 1928 she married captain Ziya Bey Seferoğlu, and took the name Nimet Seferoğlu. With him, she had a son and a daughter.

Memoirs
In 1937, Nevzad published her memoirs under the title Yıldız'dan San Remo'ya. The memoirs were published in Tan newspaper, and noteworthy information about Sultan Mehmed VI is gained. However, serious discussions were made about the memories' reliability at that period. Apart memoirs, all her life Nevzad refused to talk about the sultan and, when a journalist, in 1974 asked her what life had been like with Sultan Mehmed VI Vahideddin, she replied: “I buried that time in the depths of my heart”.

Death
Nevzad Hanım died at the age of ninety, on 23 June 1992 in her mansion in Göksu, Istanbul.

Issue
Nevzad Hanım had no child by Mehmed VI, but she had a son and a daughter by her second marriage.

Honour
 Order of Charity, 1st Class, 4 September 1921

See also
Ikbal (title)
Ottoman Imperial Harem
List of consorts of the Ottoman sultans

References

Sources

 
 

1902 births
1992 deaths
Remarried royal consorts
Emigrants from the Ottoman Empire to Italy
Nevzad
20th-century memoirists